Salme Parish was a municipality in Saare County, Estonia. It contained the northern half of the Sõrve Peninsula of the island of Saaremaa.

Besides the small borough Salme there were 24 villages: Anseküla, Easte, Hindu, Imara, Järve, Kaimri, Kaugatoma, Läätsa, Lahetaguse, Länga, Lassi, Lõmala, Lõu, Metsalõuka, Mõisaküla, Möldri, Rahuste, Suurna, Tehumardi, Tiirimetsa, Toomalõuka, Ula, Üüdibe, Vintri.

Prior to 1936, the municipality was called Abruka.
During the Second World War, the Battle of Tehumardi took place in Salme.  The location is marked by a 21-metre Soviet monument.

During the administrative-territorial reform in 2017, all 12 municipalities on the island Saaremaa were merged into a single municipality – Saaremaa Parish.

See also
Municipalities of Estonia
List of municipalities of Estonia
 The Salme ships - Two clinker-built ships with the remains of 40 persons was found autumn 2008.

References